The 2004 United States House of Representatives special election in North Carolina's 1st congressional district was held on July 20, 2004 to select the successor to Frank Ballance (D) who resigned due to health concerns and ongoing investigations which would ultimately culminate in criminal convictions on charges of committing money laundering and mail fraud. The election was won by a wide margin by former State Supreme Court Associate Justice G. K. Butterfield.

Republicans did not seriously contest this election given the strong Democratic tilt of the district, which has not elected a Republican to the United States House of Representatives since Reconstruction nor been represented by a moderate to conservative Representative since 1992 when Walter B. Jones, Sr. (D), the father of former 3rd District Representative Walter B. Jones, Jr. (R) died.

Party primaries 
Each party held a nominating convention to choose their nominee for the special election. Democrats nominated Superior Court Judge and former State Supreme Court Associate Justice G. K. Butterfield, while Republicans chose security consultant Greg Dority. Butterfield overwhelmingly won the election to fill out the rest of Ballance's unexpired term. On the same day, he and Dority both won their respective parties' primaries and would face each other again in the November general election, which Butterfield would win.

Election results

References

External links

North Carolina 1
2004
North Carolina 2004 01
2004 North Carolina elections
United States House of Representatives 2004 01
North Carolina 01